Souvenir of Gibraltar is a 1975 Belgian drama film directed by Henri Xhonneux. It was entered into the 9th Moscow International Film Festival.

Cast
 Annie Cordy as Tina
 Eddie Constantine as Jo
 François-Xavier Morel as Henri Xhonneux
 Armand Xhonneux as Armand Xhonneux
 Luc Muller as Eric Van Beuren
 Margrit Xhonneux as Margrit Xhonneux (as Margrit)
 Manda Hartmann as Li-Tchi
 Suzy Falk as La fermière
 Marie Clémence as La fille du train

References

External links
 

1975 films
1975 drama films
Belgian drama films
1970s French-language films
French-language Belgian films